Radical 205 meaning "frog" or "amphibian" is 1 of 4 Kangxi radicals (214 radicals total) composed of 13 strokes.

In the Kangxi Dictionary there are 40 characters (out of 49,030) to be found under this radical.

Characters with Radical 205

Literature

External links
Unihan Database - U+9EFD

References

205